The 1991 Phoenix Cardinals season was the 72nd season the team was in the National Football League (NFL). The team failed to improve on their previous output of 5–11, winning only four games. After beginning the season 2–0, the Cardinals suffered a tough schedule and lost their last eight matches to finish 4–12. This was the ninth consecutive season the Cardinals failed to qualify to the playoffs.

The Cardinals’ 196 points scored is the lowest total in franchise history for a 16-game season.

Offseason

NFL Draft

Personnel

Staff

Roster

Regular season

Schedule 
The 1991 Cardinals suffered from a very tough schedule playing in a powerful NFC East that provided the first four Super Bowl winners of the 1990s, and seven of ten between 1986 and 1995. Football statistics site Football Outsiders calculated that the 1991 Cardinals played the second-toughest schedule based on strength of opponent of any NFL team between 1989 and 2013, although Pro Football Reference argues that the 1991 Cardinals suffered the ninth toughest non-strike schedule since 1971. The Cardinals played just two games against opponents with losing records – both amongst their first five games and both won – whilst ten opponents including all their last five finished 10–6 or better.

Standings

Notes

References 

1991
Phoenix Cardinals
Phoenix